La Llama (Spanish "the flame") may refer to:

Literature
La Llama, autobiographical account of the Spanish Civil War by Arturo Barea  1986.
La Llama, collection of poems by Roberto Ledesma (poet)	 1955.
"La Llama", a poem by Borges
La llama, by :es:Fermín Estrella Gutiérrez 1941

Music
La Llama (opera) José María Usandizaga 1915
La Llama, album by Savath & Savalas 2009
"La Llama", song by Los Palominos Composed by Manny Benito
"La Llama", song by Macaco (band) Composed by Dani Macaco